Stearne is a given name and a surname. Notable people with the name include:

Given name
Stearne Tighe Edwards (1893–1918), Canadian flying ace
Stearne Miller (1813–1897), Irish politician and barrister
Robert Stearne Tighe (1760–1835), Irish writer

Surname
John Stearne (physician) (1624–1669), Irish physician
John Stearne (witch-hunter) (c. 1610 – 1670), English witch hunter
Kelly Stearne (1958–2016), Canadian curler

See also
Stearn, surname
Sterne (surname)
Stern (given name)